Acropolis Roquepertuse is a historical religious center for the Celts. It is located near the city of Velaux, north of Marseille and west of Aix-en-Provence, in the Provence-Alpes-Côte d'Azur région of southern France. Roquepertuse had no domiciles available for worshippers and has been used as a sanctuary where only priests may have lived permanently. It was destroyed by the Romans in 124 BC and was discovered in 1860. Most of the excavations were done in 1923 by Henri de Gérin-Ricard.

Findings

Officially, the findings have been dated to the 3rd century BC. This age has been established based on Celtic expansion into the area, which took place around the same time. However, the clothing and gestures of certain statues found at the site suggest that they date from the 5th or 6th century BC, instead. These statues are distinguished by their unique seated position, comparable to the upright and cross-legged seated position found in statues depicting the Buddha.

 A platform of 50 m by 22 m paved with flat stones including a couple of reused headstones, divided in the middle by a staircase made of large blocks of stone. Stone walls to the left and to the right of the stairs formed a terrace, probably one of several which had originally belonged to the complex.
 On the platform was what is variously called a portal, or door frame, or portico with pillars, of limestone. Its columns had cavities in which human stone masks, as well as human skulls, had been placed. Its lintel was carved with the heads of four horses, and additional decoration in paint. At the top of the lintel was a limestone statue of a bird of 60 cm by 60 cm which has been called a goose, but is now thought more likely to be a raptor.
 A dualfaced, androgynous sculpture of limestone (0.2 m high and 30 cm long).
 Two statues of a figure in a seated Buddha-like position (0.62 m high).

The first interpretations of archaeologists was that this was a secluded sanctuary. The latest findings, from various multidisciplinary studies, suggest that it was an agglomeration of about 0.5 hectares with a sanctuary to the north, as well as a bulwark of protection.

The site is important in part because it provides evidence for the Celtic "head cult" described in Greek and Roman accounts.

The site is near to another Celtic-Roman site at Entremont, which had similar relief sculpture of severed human and horse heads, as well as skull niches carved into pillars. Also see Oppidium for other nearby archaeological sites of approximately the same historical period.

External links
 In-depth description and pictures of findings: "Roquepertuse et les celto-ligures" on the Velaux city website 
 Description:  Celtic Culture: a historical encyclopedia By John T. Koch
 Current location of findings:   Musée d'archéologie méditerranéenne in Marseille  :fr:Musée d'archéologie méditerranéenne#Roquepertuse
 Current reconstruction of placement in museum: http://pcturismo.liberta.it/asp/Dettaglio.asp?IDGruppo=46250&ID=8927 
 Other possible reconstructions of the poses of the seated figures, i.e. holding skulls, holding weapons:  
 A similarly seated figure sculpture is shown on this Spanish webpage on Gauls and Celts, without identification of its origin [Celts of the Gallic Lands | http://webs.advance.com.ar/cernunnosgb/problema.htm ]

Literature 

 (in French)
 Le sanctuaire préromain de Roquepertuse à Velaux, by Henri de Gérin-Ricard (Marseille, 1929)
 L'art primitif méditerranéen de la vallée du Rhone, by Fernand Benoit (1955)
 Art et dieux de la Gaule, by Fernand Benoit (1969)
 (in English)
 "The Celtic Realms: The History and the Culture of the Celtic Peoples from Pre-History to the Norman Invasion", by Myles Dillon & Nora Chadwick (1967), pages 294-297.

Ancient Celtic religion
Celtic archaeological sites
Buildings and structures in Bouches-du-Rhône
History of Provence-Alpes-Côte d'Azur
Celtic art
Salyes